The Vodacom Challenge 2006 was played between 15 July and 22 July 2006. The teams involved were:
  Kaizer Chiefs
  Manchester United
  Orlando Pirates

First round

Third place match

Final

2006
2006–07 in English football
2006–07 in South African soccer